The John Hunter Hospital and John Hunter Children's Hospital (sometimes known as the JHH and JHCH respectively, or more colloquially the John Hunter) is a teaching hospital and children's hospital in Newcastle, and northern New South Wales, Australia. The 820 bed hospital is the main teaching hospital of the University of Newcastle. The hospital contains the only trauma centre in New South Wales outside the Sydney Metropolitan Area, and has the busiest emergency department in the state. John Hunter is the busiest trauma hospital in the state, and the second-busiest in the country behind the Alfred Hospital in Victoria .

Overview
The John Hunter health complex consists of 820 beds in total, and is co-located next to the 174 bed Newcastle Private Hospital, as well as the regional Hunter Area Pathology Service which provides tertiary level pathology testing. The complex consists of a single building, which is divided into 694 adult beds and another 126 paediatric beds in the John Hunter Children's Hospital.

The Royal Newcastle Centre (formerly Royal Newcastle Hospital), opened as an extension wing to the John Hunter Hospital in April 2006, providing 144 of these beds. Patients from the Hunter Region and beyond are referred to John Hunter for treatment in a range of specialities. The John Hunter Children's Hospital and Royal Newcastle Centre are located within the same building as the John Hunter Hospital. Also on the same grounds are Rankin Park Hospital (Rehab), Newcastle Private Hospital and the Hunter Medical Research Institute (HMRI).

John Hunter Hospital is named for the second governor of New South Wales, a Scottish-born Royal Naval officer John Hunter, who served in office from 1795 to 1800.

Specialty services provided
The JHH and JHCH are tertiary level hospitals, and provide the following specialties and subspecialties:

Wards
The John Hunter Hospital and John Hunter Children's Hospital consists of the following ~30 bed wards. Wards are designated by their horizontal position along the hospitals long corridor (by letter) and the number indicates which level of the hospital the ward is on (Levels 1–3). Hence ward E3 is positioned above E2 and next door to ward F3.

 Ward E1: Rehabilitation
 Ward E2: Urology/Rheumatology
 Ward E3: Orthopaedics
 Ward F1: Orthopaedics
 Ward F2: Immunology/Respiratory/General Medicine
 Ward F3: Cardiovascular
 Ward G1: General Medicine
 Ward G2: Neurology/Neurosurgery
 Ward G3: Cardiology/Gastroenterology
 Ward H1: Children's Medical
 Ward H2: Emergency Short Stay Unit/Medical Assessment and Coordination Unit
 Ward H3: Special Surgery/Trauma
 Ward J1: Children's Surgical and Oncology
 Ward J2: Adolescent, Day Stay and Sleep Unit
 Ward J3: General Surgery 
 Ward K1: Nephrology/Dialysis
 Ward K2: Maternity/Post-Natal
 Ward K3: Gynaecology/Gynaecology Oncology
 AGSU: Acute General Surgical Unit
 CCU: Coronary Care Unit
 ED: Emergency Department
 Transplant: Transplant
 ICU/HD: Intensive Care Unit/High Dependency Unit
 PICU: Paediatric Intensive Care Unit
 NICU: Neonatal Intensive Care Unit
 NEXUS: Adolescent Mental Health

Origin of name
A unique aspect of the John Hunter Hospital is the reasoning behind its name. Rather than being named after one person, the JHH is named in honour of three men, all of whom were called John Hunter. They were:
 John Hunter, a former governor of New South Wales and the namesake of the whole Hunter region
 John Hunter, the famed 18th-century surgeon and pioneer of anatomical pathology, and
 John Irvine Hunter, an Australian anatomist who died in 1924 at the age of 26, having already been appointed the youngest anatomy professor at the University of Sydney

Solar array
In late 2021, a solar installation said to be the largest on any hospital in the world, was switched on at the John Hunter Hospital. It contains more than 5,000 solar panels, covers 12,000 square metres, and generates 3.24 gigawatt-hours per year.

References

External links 

Hunter New England Local Health Network

Hospital buildings completed in 1991
Hospitals in New South Wales
Buildings and structures in Newcastle, New South Wales
Teaching hospitals in Australia
Hospitals established in 1991
1991 establishments in Australia